Bermuda competed at the 1968 Summer Olympics in Mexico City, Mexico.

Athletics

Men
Track & road events

Sailing

Open

References
Official Olympic Reports

Nations at the 1968 Summer Olympics
1968
1968 in Bermudian sport